Sosnovy Bor is a rural locality (a village) in Maginsky Selsoviet, Karaidelsky District, Bashkortostan, Russia. The population was 152 as of 2010. There are 6 streets.

Geography 
Sosnovy Bor is located 17 km east of Karaidel (the district's administrative centre) by road.

References 

Rural localities in Karaidelsky District